Kim Oliver (born 1 September 1983) is a former English rugby union player. She represented  at the 2006 and 2010 Women's Rugby World Cups. She retired from international rugby in 2013.

Oliver is Head Coach for Bristol Bears Women. She has a black belt in Judo.

References

External links
 Player profile

1983 births
Living people
England women's international rugby union players
English female rugby union players
English female judoka
Rugby union players from Bath, Somerset
Rugby union wings